Gerd Geraf (also known as Jirfidreh) is a village in Layl Rural District, in the Central District of Lahijan County, Gilan Province, Iran. At the 2006 census, its population was 73, in 21 families.

References 

Populated places in Lahijan County